Gaju Khan Baba, also spelled Gajju Khan or Gajo Khan, was a Pashtun revolutionary leader. He is often seen as a founding chief of the Yusufzai tribe.

His tomb is in Swabi, Khyber Pakhtunkhwa.

References

1490 births
1565 deaths
Pashtun people
Pashtun tribes
15th-century Afghan people
All articles lacking reliable references